Kusuma Wardhani (born 20 February 1964) is a retired Indonesian archer. Together with Nurfitriyana Saiman and Lilies Handayani she won a team silver medal at the 1988 Olympics, bringing the first ever Olympic medal to Indonesia. In the 1980s,  Wardhani won multiple medals in individual recurve events at the Southeast Asian Games. After retiring from competitions she headed the Education, Youth and Sports Office of Bali.

In popular culture
Portrayed by Tara Basro in the 2016 Indonesian film 3 Srikandi.

References

1964 births
Living people
Indonesian female archers
Olympic archers of Indonesia
Archers at the 1988 Summer Olympics
Olympic silver medalists for Indonesia
Sportspeople from Makassar
Olympic medalists in archery
Medalists at the 1988 Summer Olympics
Southeast Asian Games gold medalists for Indonesia
Southeast Asian Games bronze medalists for Indonesia
Southeast Asian Games medalists in archery
Competitors at the 1987 Southeast Asian Games
20th-century Indonesian women
21st-century Indonesian women